Phenatoma is a genus of predatory sea snails, marine gastropod mollusks in the family Borsoniidae.

Species
Species within the genus Phenatoma include:
 † Phenatoma decessor Marwick, 1928
 † Phenatoma lawsi Powell, 1942
 † Phenatoma perlata (Suter, 1917)
 † Phenatoma precursor Powell, 1942
 Phenatoma roseum (Quoy & Gaimard, 1833)
 Phenatoma zealandica (E. A. Smith, 1877)
Species brought into synonymy
 † Phenatoma (Cryptomella) crassispiralis Marwick, 1929: synonym of  † Tomopleura crassispiralis (Marwick, 1929)
 Phenatoma novaezelandiae (Reeve, 1843): synonym of Phenatoma rosea (Quoy & Gaimard, 1833)
 † Phenatoma (Cryptomella) crassispiralis Marwick, 1929: synonym of † Tomopleura crassispiralis (Marwick, 1929)  (original combination)

References

Further reading
 Powell A. W. B., New Zealand Mollusca, William Collins Publishers Ltd, Auckland, New Zealand 1979 
  Bouchet P., Kantor Yu.I., Sysoev A. & Puillandre N. (2011) A new operational classification of the Conoidea. Journal of Molluscan Studies 77: 273-308.
 

 
Gastropod genera
Taxa named by Harold John Finlay